Center is the name of some places in the U.S. state of Wisconsin:
Center (community), Wisconsin, an unincorporated community
Center, Outagamie County, Wisconsin, a town
Center, Rock County, Wisconsin, a town
Center, Lafayette County, Wisconsin, a former name for the town of Darlington (town), Wisconsin